Çiğdem Belci (born 17 June 1987) is a Turkish women's football defender currently playing in the Women's Super League for Beşiktaş in Istanbul with jersey number 5. She is a member of the Turkish national team since 2003.

Early life
Çiğdem Belci was born on 17 June 1987 in Mersin, southern Turkey. She has three older sisters and a younger brother, who follows her footsteps playing in a feeder club in Mersin.

At the age of eight, she began playing football with boys in the neighborhood. Convinced by her daughter's interest, the father took her then to Mersin Camspor, and registered her. However, feared of her daughter's future, he wanted her leave the club. Her mother supported Çiğdem, and was able to stop the father's pressure. Her father changed his mind when she transferred to successful clubs and continued with her higher education.

She studied physical education and sports at Ondokuz Mayıs University in Samsun. After graduation, she was appointed a teacher.

Career

Club

Çiğdem Belci obtained her license from her hometown club Mersin Camspor on 1 September 1999, where she played until the end of 2007–08 season and capped 13 times scoring three goals. She moved to Mersingücü Cengiz Topelspor and after one season, she transferred to the Black Sea club Trabzonspor for the 2009–10 season.

The next season, Belci signed for the Istanbul-based club Ataşehirspor, and enjoyed two consecutive league championships in 2011 and 2012. She debuted in the UEFA Women's Champions League playing against Lithuanian side Gintra Universitetas on 11 August 2011. She participated in three group matches of the qualifying round. The next year, she played again in three qualifying round matches. However, her team was not successful either in 2011–12 or in 2012–13 to advance further to the knockout stage.

For the 2015–16 season, she signed with Kireçburnu Spor, which was recently promoted to the Women's First League. Belci serves as the captain of the team. In the 2016–17 season, she returned to her former club Ataşehir Belediyespor.

In the 2018–19 league season, she transferred to Beşiktaş J.K. She enjoyed the champion title of her team in the 2018–19 season. She took part at the 2019–20 UEFA Women's Champions League - Group 9 matches.  She played in one matc of the 2021–22 UEFA Women's Champions League qualifying rounds. In the 2022-23 Super League season, she transferred to Fatih Karagümrük S.K.

International

Belci made her first appearance in the Turkey women's U-19 national team in the match against Romania juniors at the  International Norte Alentejano Tournament held in Portugal on 28 May 2003. She capped five times in the junior women's national team.

On 6 August 2003, she debuted in the national team playing in the friendly match against Russia. Her international participations followed at the UEFA Women's Euro 2009 qualifying round (Northern Ireland, Croatia and Georgia), at the UEFA Support International Tournaments (Bulgaria, Azerbaijan, Estonia, Croatia, Malta, Latvia and Macedonia). Belci played in seven of the eight matches at the 2011 FIFA Women's World Cup qualification – UEFA Group 5 matches (Spain, England, Malta and Austria) as well as in eight of ten matches at the UEFA Women's Euro 2013 qualifying – Group 2 (Spain, Kazakhstan, Romania, Germany and Switzerland). In 2013, she participated in all the three 2015 FIFA Women's World Cup qualification – UEFA Group 6 matches against English and Montenegron women.

Career statistics
.

Honours
Turkish Women's First Football League
Ataşehir Belediyespor
 Winners (3): 2010–11, 2011–12, 2017–18
 Runners-up (3): 2012–13, 2013–14, 2014–15
Third places (1): 2016–17

Beşiktaş J.K.
 Winners (2): 2018–19, 2020–21

References

External links
 

Living people
1987 births
Sportspeople from Mersin
Turkish women's footballers
Trabzonspor women's players
Ataşehir Belediyespor players
Kireçburnu Spor players
Turkey women's international footballers
Ondokuz Mayıs University alumni
Turkish schoolteachers
Women's association football defenders
Beşiktaş J.K. women's football players
Turkish Women's Football Super League players
Fatih Karagümrük S.K. (women's football) players
21st-century Turkish women